The Crystal City (2003) is an alternate history/fantasy novel by American writer Orson Scott Card. It is the sixth book in Card's The Tales of Alvin Maker series and is about Alvin Miller, the seventh son of a seventh son.

Plot summary
Alvin and Arthur stay at a boarding house where mixed-blood children are cared for by Papa Moose and Mama Squirrel. While there, Alvin uses his knack to cleanse the mosquitoes and disease from a well. A young woman, whom the people call Dead Mary, sees what he has done and asks him to come with her and heal her mother, who has yellow fever. Because Alvin heals her, the Yellow Fever spreads throughout Nueva Barcelona, averting an impending war with the United States over slavery. As the fever spreads, people begin to suspect Papa Moose and Mama Squirrel because Alvin has been healing everyone he can, radiating outward through the city. Alvin is then approached by La Tia, an African woman, who wants him to help all the slaves and the displaced French to escape Nueva Barcelona. He reluctantly agrees.

Alvin's brother, Calvin, at the behest of Alvin's wife, Margaret, comes to help. Calvin raises a thick fog while Alvin uses his blood (magic he learned from the Red Prophet Tenskwa-Tawa) to construct a crystal bridge across lake Ponchartrain to the north. Arthur helps Alvin with the bridge. While the escapees flee north, they take food and provision from plantations along the way and free any slaves they find. Alvin goes to Tenskwa-Tawa on the other side of the Mizzippy to ask for safe passage through the Red Man's lands, so they can escape the pursuing army. Alvin and Tenskwa-Tawa put on a show by holding back the Mizzippy river to allow the exodus of people from Nueva Barcelona to cross, while the pursuing army can do nothing but watch. Calvin leaves with Jim Bowie and Steve Austin to conquer the Mexica. Verily Cooper is sent by Margaret to seek out Abe Lincoln and get his help for figuring out what to do with all the runaways when they reach the Noisy River Territory.

Alvin discovers that Tenskwa-Tawa has been collaborating with La Tia to create a volcanic eruption under the Mexica, who are becoming increasingly threatening. Alvin sends Arthur to initiate the eruption and warn his brother Calvin, who ignores the warning but still manages to escape. Bowie and several others leave with Arthur. The people travel through the Indian lands using the greensong, which allows them to move more quickly. When they reach the Noisy River territory, Abe Lincoln and Verily Cooper have decided to create a new county so they can appoint their own judges that will resist the law to return slaves to their masters. There Alvin starts to build the crystal city he saw in a vision. He realizes that not everyone has to have maker skills, but can contribute in their own way—felling trees, digging the foundation, etc. But all is not well. Calvin and Bowie arrive and decide to stay.

See also

 List of works by Orson Scott Card

External links

 About the novel The Crystal City from Card's website

2003 American novels
2003 fantasy novels
The Tales of Alvin Maker series novels
American fantasy novels
American alternate history novels
Tor Books books
Cultural depictions of James Bowie
Fictional depictions of Abraham Lincoln in literature